The New York City AIDS Memorial is a public memorial in Greenwich Village, Manhattan, New York City built "to honor New York City's 100,000+ men, women and children who have died from AIDS, and to commemorate and celebrate the efforts of the caregivers and activists." It is the first major space that is dedicated to the epidemic in New York City. The memorial was opened on World AIDS Day on December 1, 2016. The design was developed by the efforts of nearly 500 architects who came up with the idea of an 18-foot steel canopy as the gateway to the new St. Vincent's Hospital Park in Greenwich Village.

Description 

The New York City AIDS Memorial is located on the triangular traffic island formed by 12th Street, Greenwich Avenue and Seventh Avenue in Greenwich Village. The memorial is a gateway to a new public park adjacent to the former St. Vincent's Hospital, which housed the city's first and largest AIDS ward and which is often considered the symbolic epicenter of the disease, figuring prominently in The Normal Heart, Angels in America, and other important pieces of literature and art that tell the story of the plague years in New York.

The structure is composed by triangles ranging from scalene to equilateral. Three triangles serve as legs to connect two large triangles at the top, so that it looks like an open airplane. Each of the triangles is filled with 16 smaller triangles and all have lines like air vents that light up in the night.

History 

In November 2011, in collaboration with magazine Architectural Record and industry database Architizer, the NYC AIDS board announced an international design competition to design the memorial park. Brooklyn-based Studio a+i, led by Mateo Paiva, Lily Lim and Esteban Erlich, won the contest and became memorial park architects. The winning design was rejected by the owner, Rudin Management. The memorial also features the work of visual artist Jenny Holzer whose idea was to engrave a granite panel with lines from Walt Whitman's "Song of Myself".

See also
 AIDS Memorial Grove
 Plop art

References

Further reading 
 
 
  (Audio interview with David France, author of How to Survive a Plague.)

2016 establishments in New York City
Buildings and structures completed in 2016
Greenwich Village
HIV/AIDS in the United States
Historiography of LGBT in New York City
Monuments and memorials in Manhattan
HIV/AIDS memorials